Shah Mansur may refer to:
 Shah Mansur, East Azerbaijan
 Shah Mansur, Ilam

See also
 Shah Mansuri (disambiguation)